Vice Admiral Paolo La Rosa is a retired Italian Navy officer who served as Chief of Staff of the Italian Navy.

References

1947 births
Living people
Italian admirals
Military personnel from Bologna